The following is a list of all team-to-team transactions that have occurred in the National Basketball Association during the 2008–09 NBA season. It lists what team each player has been traded to, signed by, or claimed by, and for which players or draft picks, if applicable.

Retirement

Front office movements

Coaching changes

Off-season

In-season

General manager change

Player movements

Trades

Free agency
The following lists players who join or leave other team via free agency. Some dates might be contrast from other sources.

Going overseas

Released

Waived

Going overseas

Draft picks

Signed

From previous seasons

Signed undrafted players

References
General

Specific

Transactions
NBA transactions